Mace Stanley Brown (May 21, 1909 – March 24, 2002) was an American professional baseball player, scout and coach. He appeared in Major League Baseball, largely as a relief pitcher, over ten seasons (1935–43; 1946) for the Pittsburgh Pirates, Brooklyn Dodgers and Boston Red Sox. Brown posted a 76–57 record with a 3.46 ERA and 44 saves in 387 appearances (55 as a starter).

Playing career
Brown was also a javelin thrower who attended the University of Iowa on a track scholarship. He started his professional baseball career after college. In 1934, he won 19 games for the Tulsa Oilers of the Texas League and was purchased by the Pirates in November.

Brown became known as one of the first full-time relief specialists in the Major Leagues. In 1938, he led the Pirates with 15 wins (all in relief), led the National League with 51 games pitched, and became the first reliever to play the All-Star Game. In 1943, with the Red Sox, he also led the American League in games pitched with 49.

However, Brown is also known for giving up the Homer in the Gloamin', the home run that cost the Pirates their lead in the 1938 National League pennant race. On September 28, 1938, the Pirates were playing the Chicago Cubs, who trailed the Pirates by just one-half game in the league standings. Brown entered the game with the teams tied 5–5 in the bottom of the ninth inning.  Darkness was falling fast, and the Cubs' Wrigley Field had no lights, meaning the game could end in a tie. But Gabby Hartnett soon smacked a pitch from Brown over the left-center field wall, giving the Cubs the victory and propelling them into first place.  The Pirates proceeded to lose four of their final five games, securing the Cubs' hold on the pennant.

Brown missed the 1944 and 1945 seasons while serving as Lieutenant junior grade in the United States Navy during World War II.

Scout and coach
Following his playing career, Brown served as a coach and North Carolina-based scout for the Red Sox organization from 1947 through 1989.  He was the Major League pitching coach for the 1965 Red Sox, serving on the staff of manager Billy Herman, who was the Cubs' starting second baseman in the "Homer in the Gloamin'" game.

As a spring training coach for the Red Sox, Brown worked with both pitchers and catchers. Among the latter was Carlton Fisk who credited Mace with teaching him technical and leadership skills that stayed with him throughout his career.

Brown died in Greensboro, North Carolina, at the age of 92.

See also
List of Major League Baseball annual saves leaders

References

Further reading

External links

Mace Brown at SABR (Baseball BioProject)
Mace Brown at Baseball Almanac

  

1909 births
2002 deaths
Baseball players from Iowa
Boston Red Sox coaches
Boston Red Sox players
Boston Red Sox scouts
Brooklyn Dodgers players
Des Moines Demons players
Durham Bulls players
Greensboro Patriots players
Iowa Hawkeyes baseball players
Kansas City Blues (baseball) players
Los Angeles Angels (minor league) players
Major League Baseball pitchers
Major League Baseball pitching coaches
Military personnel from Iowa
National League All-Stars
People from North English, Iowa
Pittsburgh Pirates players
St. Joseph Saints players
Shawnee Robins players
Tulsa Oilers (baseball) players
United States Navy officers
United States Navy personnel of World War II
University of Iowa alumni